The Conqueror class battleships were ironclad warships which served in the Victorian Royal Navy, and whose main weapon was designed to be the ram.

Description
At the time of their inception and design, it appeared to naval architects that armour plate could be made resistant enough to protect the essential areas of warships from incoming artillery fire, and that therefore an alternative method of offence was needed in order to achieve a  decisive outcome in any future naval combat. The answer appeared to be to use the whole ship as a projectile with which to ram an enemy.

These ships were of only moderate size, and were intended to be adequately fast, and manoeuvrable enough to be able to catch and strike a fleeing or manoeuvering enemy. They carried a single turret with two large guns, which were intended to engage on either beam an enemy who had evaded a ramming attack. Firing over the bow was expected to cause unacceptable structural damage from blast.

The ships were not seen as successful, as they were too small for efficient service as ocean-going vessels, and too large to function close inshore as coast- or harbour-defence ships. They had approximately nine feet of freeboard forward, and could not make more than ten knots in rough weather. They also rolled excessively. Neither ship ever saw any front-line deployment, spending their entire lives as gunnery tenders or in reserve.

References

 Brown, David K.  Warrior to Dreadnought: Warship Development 1860–1905.  London: Caxton Editions, 2003. .
 Gardiner, Robert, Roger Chesneau and Eugene M Kolesnik. Conway's All the World's Fighting Ships 1860–1905. London: Conway Maritime Press, 1979.  .
 Parkes, Oscar. British Battleships  .

Battleship classes
Steam rams
 
Ship classes of the Royal Navy
Conqueror class battleship